María Paulina Milada Kantor Pupkin (born 10 April 1964) is a Chilean politician and journalist, militant from Political Evolution (Evópoli/EVOP).

She is of Jewish descent.

References

External links
 

1964 births
Living people
Chilean people
Chilean people of Jewish descent
Pontifical Catholic University of Chile alumni
School of International and Public Affairs, Columbia University alumni
21st-century Chilean politicians
Evópoli politicians
Women government ministers of Chile
Chilean Ministers of Sport